The Philadelphia Revolution were a Tier III Junior A ice hockey team in the Eastern Hockey League. The team played home games at Revolution Ice Gardens (formerly The Rink at Warwick) in Warwick Township, Pennsylvania, a suburb of Philadelphia.

History
The Revolution joined the Eastern Junior Hockey League (EJHL) for the 2009–10 season after the owners of the Tier III Junior B Tri-State Selects of the Empire Junior Hockey League (EmJHL) purchased the Boston Jr. Shamrocks EJHL franchise. The organization would become the Philadelphia Revolution and field Tier III teams in the Junior A EJHL, Junior B EmJHL, and the Junior B Eastern States Hockey League (ESHL).

In 2013, Tier III junior hockey leagues underwent a reorganization that led to the dissolution of the EJHL. The Revolution joined the Atlantic Junior Hockey League which then re-branded itself as the Eastern Hockey League (EHL). The Revolution organization also field teams at the U19 Elite Level, the U16 Elite Level in the Elite Prospects League. Their former Junior B team in the EmJHL began playing in the Metropolitan Junior Hockey League (MJHL) after the EmJHL joined the United States Premier Hockey League in 2013. The MJHL Revolution team then joined the EHL-19U Elite Division in 2016. They dropped their Junior B ESHL team when that league disbanded in the 2013 reorganization. In 2017, the EHL re-branded again, dropping the Premier name from their top division and renamed the Elite Division to Premier.

The team was removed from the EHL website prior to the 2020-21 season and appears to drop all junior level teams. The organization still runs youth hockey teams through the midget level.

Season-by-season records

References

External links
 Official Team Site

Amateur ice hockey teams in Pennsylvania